Ivan Dagnin (4 March 1938 – 6 May 2018) was a South African cricketer. He played in four first-class matches for Western Province between 1971 and 1983.

References

External links
 

1938 births
2018 deaths
South African cricketers
Western Province cricketers
Place of birth missing